Jan Knobelauch Hansen (born 15 July 1971) is a male athlete from Denmark.  He competes in triathlon.

Hansen competed at the first Olympic triathlon at the 2000 Summer Olympics.  He took forty-fourth place with a total time of 1:55:42.06.

References
sports-reference

Danish male triathletes
Olympic triathletes of Denmark
Triathletes at the 2000 Summer Olympics
1971 births
Living people
Duathletes
Place of birth missing (living people)
21st-century Danish people